Janice Ann Crosio  (born 3 January 1939) is an Australian politician from the Labor Party. She was a member of the New South Wales Legislative Assembly, and became the first woman Cabinet minister in New South Wales. Later she was a  member of the Australian House of Representatives, and a Parliamentary Secretary.

Early life
Crosio was born in the Sydney suburb of Granville and educated at Strathfield Girls High School.  In 1957, she married Ivo Crosio and they have one son and twin daughters.  She was an alderman of Fairfield City Council in suburban Sydney from 1971 to 1980 and Mayor from 1974 to 1975 and 1977 to 1980.

State politics
Crosio was the first woman elected to the New South Wales Legislative Assembly in thirty years, representing Fairfield from 1981 to 1988 and Smithfield from 1988 to 1990.  She was the first woman Cabinet minister in New South Wales: Minister for Natural Resources 1984–86, Minister for Local Government 1986–88 and Minister for Water Resources 1986–88.

Federal politics
Crosio represented Prospect, New South Wales from March 1990 to October 2004.  She was Parliamentary Secretary to the Minister for Arts and Administrative Services in 1993, Parliamentary Secretary to the Minister for Environment, Sport and Territories 1993–94 and Parliamentary Secretary to the Minister for Social Security 1994–96.  Crosio was Chief Opposition Whip 2001–04. She retired at the 2004 election.

Honours
Crosio was made a Member of the Order of the British Empire for services to local government and the community in 1978.  She was made Knight of the Order of Merit of the Italian Republic in 1980 for services to the Italian Community.  In 2006 she was made a Member (AM) in the General Division of the Order of Australia in recognition of her service to the Parliaments of the Australian Commonwealth and of New South Wales, her service to her municipality and also for her pioneering of women's participation in politics.

References

|-

|-

|-

1939 births
Living people
Members of the Australian House of Representatives
Members of the Australian House of Representatives for Prospect
Australian Labor Party members of the Parliament of Australia
Members of the New South Wales Legislative Assembly
Labor Right politicians
Women members of the Australian House of Representatives
Australian Labor Party members of the Parliament of New South Wales
New South Wales local councillors
Mayors of Fairfield, New South Wales
Members of the Order of Australia
Australian Members of the Order of the British Empire
Knights of the Order of Merit of the Italian Republic
21st-century Australian politicians
21st-century Australian women politicians
20th-century Australian politicians
Women members of the New South Wales Legislative Assembly
Women mayors of places in New South Wales
20th-century Australian women politicians
Women local councillors in Australia